The Whirlwind Girl is a 2015 Chinese television series based on the novel of the same name written by Ming Xiaoxi. It aired on Hunan TV from 7 July to 26 August 2015.

Synopsis
The story tells the journey of Qi Baicao (Hu Bingqing) who has a fondness for Yuanwudao (a martial arts sport) ever since she was little. After her parents died in a fire accident, Bai Cao is adopted and raised by Qu Xiangnan, the former world champion of Yuanwudao, whose skills and reputation have been defamed by his rivals. Honest, righteous, and determined to succeed, Bai Cao gradually transforms from a "weed" into a professional Yuanwudao athlete, fighting her way to the top and reclaiming her teacher's innocence. Along the way she encounters friends such as her stoic and selfless senior Ruo Bai (Yang Yang), the warm and caring but mysteriously secluded medic Yu Chuyuan (Bai Jingting), and the flirtatious, playful Fang Tinghao (Chen Xiang) with a hidden agenda as well as rivals such Fang Tingyi (Zhao Yuannuan).

Cast

Main
Hu Bingqing as Qi Baicao - An honest, humble and hardworking girl who has loved Yuanwudao since she was young. Her parents died in a fire accident and she was taken in by her teacher who she always supports and believes in. Though she hasn't had any formal training or experience, she initially starts competing in competitions for SongBai as a white belt and keeps working her way to the top with determination, becoming an exceptional and outstanding player in the female Yuanwudao community, earning the title, "The Whirlwind Girl".
Yang Yang as Ruo Bai - He is BaiCao's senior at Song Bai with whom she trains with. With his help, BaiCao works her way to the top. He is shown to be stoic and cold with a hidden kind heart. He takes notice of BaiCao's huge potential. He falls deeply in love with BaiCao from the beginning and is willing to do anything to help her accomplish her dreams, however he keeps his feelings to himself. Baicao initially sees him as her friend and mentor and is completely oblivious to his feelings for her. But in the end she later realizes that he is the one who is important in her heart.
Chen Xiang as Fang Tinghao  - An international Yuanwudao champion and the current number one player, who is initially shown to be arrogant and flirtatious, yet has a kind heart. He develops an interest in BaiCao after meeting her for the first time and admires her skills in Yuanwudao. He soon falls deeply in love with her and gets jealous whenever he sees her with someone else. However Baicao only sees him as an important friend and respects him as a senior.
Zhao Yuannuan as Fang Tingyi - She is Tinghao's sister. A vain and arrogant girl, she is a Yuanwudao champion, and is regarded as "Moon Goddess", a superstar in the Yuanwudao world due to her talents and beautiful appearance. She likes Chuyuan, and is jealous of his love for Baicao. However, she later realizes her mistakes and encourages Baicao not to give up and continue to fight for SongBai. Fang Tingyi and Qi Baicao are like two sides of the same coin. Both are humbled by each other. When Baicao lost to Tingyi, she realizes that her strength alone wasn't going to help her and that there is no shortcut to hard work, no matter how long it takes, thus she is humbled by Tingyi. Tingyi is also humbled by Baicao when she realizes that her arrogance isn't going to get her anywhere and that it shouldn't matter if Baicao reaches her level because she doesn't practice Yuanwudao just to keep defeating Baicao, rather she practices it because she loves the sport. She is also the only person besides En-Xiu who hasn't been defeated by Baicao.
Bai Jingting as Yu Chuyuan - A former champion in the world of Yuanwudao who was number one. He quit Yuanwudao 4 years ago and is now a young medic. He is a humble and calm person and he too falls for BaiCao. Baicao likes him a bit initially but later realizes that she only sees him as her senior brother and close friend. The reason he quit the sport is revealed later on.
Ji Chang-wook as Chang An (Season 2) - The original drillmaster at Yun Feng Hall. A cold-hearted person initially, he was the youngest Yuanwudao master and the youngest exceptional player. He was betrayed by his close friend at Yun Feng and kicked out of due to a leg injury due to which he can no longer compete in matches. He then becomes the coach at Song Bai and trains BaiCao so that he could use her for his revenge plan due to her skilled abilities but ends up falling in love with her.

Supporting

Song Bai Yuanwudao Center
Leo Wu as Hu Yifeng
Ruo Bai's dorm mate. He appears to be lazy, but is very talented. He often bickers with Xiaoying, and later falls in love with her. He is good friends with Baicao.
Tan Songyun as Fan Xiaoying
Baicao's best friend; who always supports Baicao in times of need. She is a cheerful and playful girl. She likes Ruo Bai initially, but later falls in love with Yifeng whom she often bickers with. 
Li Ze as Wu Xiuda: He initially disliked Baicao but soon comes to support her and becomes one of her close friends. It is hinted that he developed a crush on Baicao.
Yu Haoyang as Wu Xiuqin: She too didn't like Baicao at first. Baicao had strong abilities, hence she was worried that Baicao might take her place, but when Baicao cheers and supports her during a match, she comes to like Baicao and supports her.
Qie Lutong as Song Pingping: She was skeptical of Baicao coming to SongBai initially, but soon becomes her close friend.
Li Ji as Yin Yin: She too was skeptical of Baicao coming to SongBai initially, but soon becomes her close friend.
Gao Guangze as Yang Rui: He too didn't like the idea of Baicao being at SongBai, but later he becomes her close friend.
Li Qiang as Master Yu: Master of Song Bai Yuanwudao Center and Chuyuan's adoptive father. He is a kind hearted person and accepts Baicao as a student of SongBai at her master's request.

Quan Sheng Yuanwudao Center
Vincent Chiao as Qu Xiangnan
The former world champion of Yuanwudao; Baicao's master and Guangya's father. He started to look after Baicao during her childhood after her parents died in a fire accident. Due to an incident where he was framed for taking drugs, he was banned from the Yuanwudao industry. No believes in his innocence except for Baicao, who sees him as her father and is willing to anything to stand up for his honor.
Yu Tinger as Qu Guangya
Qu Xiangnan's daughter. She appears to be cold but is actually very kind. She is Baicao's childhood friend and cares for her deeply. 
Feng Peng as Zheng Yuanhai
Current Master of Quan Sheng Yuanwudao Center.

This drama is highly recommended.

Xian Wu Yuanwudao Center
Yang Tailang as Shen Bo: He is Ting Hao's close friend and usually serves as an informative during Baicao's competitions. He also often talks to Ting Hao about Ting Hao's love for Baicao and supports it.
Wang Deshun as Master Wan
Master of Xian Wu Taekwondo Center and the Fang siblings' maternal grandfather.
Shi Xiaoqun as Shen Ning
A talented Yuanwudao coach, who is the role model of many female students. She is also Guangya's aunt.She believes that Qu Xiangnan (the husband of her late sister) had taken stimulants to cheat and as a result her sister had died from the shock. As a result she doesn't like Baicao initially because Baicao regards Qu Xiangnan as her master. However, she is surprised by Baicao's abilities and comes to appreciate her.

Chang Hai Yuanwudao Center
Jiang Yiyi as Kim Min-joo 
A Yuanwudao student from South Korea, who is frank and adorable. Due to her father's rivalry with Qu Xiangnan, she holds a grudge against An Yang students. She initially dislikes Baicao, but eventually comes to admire her abilities and her personality.
Zhang Xueying as Li En-xiu
Chuyuan's half-sister. A kind-hearted and innocent girl who likes Tinghao. She is also an outstanding Yuanwudao athlete, the current top player in the female Yuanwudao community, referred to as "Maiden Master" and is Baicao's role model. She likes Baicao the moment they meet and comments on her remarkable abilities. She is also the only person besides Fang Tingyi who hasn't been defeated by Baicao and is the only one who has defeated Fang Tingyi.
Sun Lishi as Kim Yishan 
Min-joo's father, and Qu Xiangnan's opponent. It is hinted that he may have used an underhanded method to defeat Qu Xiangnan back then to become world Yuanwudao champion.
Jang Tae-hoon as Min Shenghao  
Yishan's beloved disciple. A determined and upright guy, who became the runner-up at the Yuanwudao Youth Champion after Tinghao. He is close to Min-joo, and admires En-xiu.  
Li Jiacheng as Min Zai

Others
Huang Xiaolin as Mei Ling : A strong competitor whom Baicao defeats in her first Institute match. She was angry for being defeated by Baicao who just a white belt then but becomes her friend after Baicao kindly respects her.
Ma Chengcheng as Lin Feng : The second strongest female Yuanwudao competitor in China after Tingyi. She was defeated by Baicao in the quarter-finals of the Institute matches. She befriends Baicao after her defeat and supports her later on too.
Yang Xiaodan as Xiao Ying's mother : A kind hearted woman, who treats Baicao as her own daughter.
Fu Jia as Xiao Ying's father 
Ma Ruojing as Pu Dongyuan, the person behind the drugs incident regarding Qu Xiangnan. 
Li Haohan as Li Yunyue : The Father of En-xiu, Yin-xiu and Chuyuan.
Yi Ji as Shen Yuan, Qu Xiangnan's wife and Shen Ning's sister. She loved Baicao as her own daughter and used to look after her in her childhood. She died in childbirth which was just after her husband had been framed for taking drugs.
Xu Huiwen as Ruo Bai's mother

Production
In season 1, Xu Jiao was originally chosen to portray Qi Baicao, but withdrew due to physical problem and speech. The role eventually went to Hu Bingqing. This series also marks the second collaboration between Leo Wu and Jiang Yiyi. Filming began in April 2015 at Changsha and ended in July 2015.

Soundtrack

Reception
The drama is a commercial success. It maintained the number one spot in its timeslot during  broadcast, with an average viewership rating of 1.68% (CSM50) and 2.43% (Nationwide), becoming one of the highest rated Chinese dramas for the year 2015. It also has 2 billion views on Mango TV.

Ratings

 Highest ratings are marked in red, lowest ratings are marked in blue

Awards
28th Golden Eagle Awards - Outstanding Television Series
22nd Huading Awards - Best Newcomer (Tan Songyun)

International broadcast
 Season 1

 Season 2

Sequel
The second season of the drama, The Whirlwind Girl 2, starred Korean actor Ji Chang-wook and An Yuexi.

References

Chinese romantic comedy television series
Chinese sports television series
2015 Chinese television series debuts
Television shows based on Chinese novels
Hunan Television dramas
Television series by Mango Studios